WTNC-LD (channel 26) is a low-powered television station licensed to Raleigh, North Carolina, United States, broadcasting the Spanish-language UniMás network. It is owned and operated by TelevisaUnivision alongside Fayetteville-licensed Univision owned-and-operated station WUVC-DT (channel 40). Both stations share studios on Falls of Neuse Road in Raleigh, while WTNC-LD's transmitter is located on Rose of Sharon Road in Durham.

Although WTNC-LD identifies as a separate station in its own right, it is officially licensed as a translator of WUVC-DT. In addition to its own digital signal, WTNC-LD is simulcast in high definition on WUVC-DT's second digital subchannel (virtual channel 40.2, UHF channel 22.2) from a transmitter northeast of Broadway, North Carolina. WUVC-DT, in turn, is simulcast on WTNC-LD's second digital subchannel.

History

The station originally signed on in early 1997 as W59CR from a tower near the corner of NC 98 and US 70 By-Pass in East Durham. Broadcasting then on channel 59, the station rebroadcast WACN-LP (channel 34) from Apex, a Christian TV station. The call letters changed to WIWW-LP in late 1997.

When WUNC-TV needed UHF channel 59 for digital, WIWW vacated the channel for UHF 26 on the WNCU tower off Rose of Sharon Road in northwest Durham. It was home shopping for a while, then dark, then Telefutura (now UniMás).

In 2007, WTNC began simulcasting as a digital subchannel of sister station WUVC-TV in Fayetteville and other southern regions of the viewing area. In 2010, WTNC switched to digital broadcasting.

Subchannels
The station's digital signal is multiplexed:

References

External links

TNC-LD
UniMás network affiliates
TNC-LD
Television channels and stations established in 1997
1997 establishments in North Carolina
Low-power television stations in the United States